The Vivacity 20 is a British trailerable sailboat that was designed by Peter Stevenson and Des C. Pollard as a racer-cruiser and first built in 1963.

The design is a lengthened development of the Alacrity 19.

Production
The design was built by Russell Marine in Essex, England, starting in 1963, but it is now out of production. The boat was produced complete and ready to sail or as a kit for amateur completion. It was also imported in the United States by Wells Yachts starting in the early 1960s.

Design
The Vivacity 20 is a recreational keelboat, built predominantly of glassfibre, with wood trim. It has a masthead sloop rig, a spooned raked stem, a reverse transom, a transom-hung rudder controlled by a tiller and twin keels or an optional single, fixed fin keel. It displaces  and carries  of ballast.  of flooding water ballast. The ballast is drained for road transport.

The boat is normally fitted with a small  outboard motor for docking and manoeuvring.

The design has sleeping accommodation for four people, with a double "V"-berth in the bow cabin and two straight settee berths in the main cabin. The galley is located on the starboard side just aft of the bow cabin and is equipped with a sink. The head is located just aft of the bow cabin on the port side.

For sailing the design is equipped with a range of jibs or genoas.

Operational history
In a 2010 review Steve Henkel wrote, "the Vivacity 20 was a popular early fiberglass micro-cruiser. Like her predecessor, the Alacrity 19 ... she features twin bilge keels and a low profile doghouse ... The boat was available as a kit, so there are numerous variations in finish and details ... It should also be noted that apart from six inches more on the waterline and 350 pounds more ballast, the Vivacity is thought by many to be almost indistinguishable from the Alacrity. Best features: About the best we can say for the Vivacity is that, like her near-sister Alacrity, she's a nice boat for her vintage, but her generally more up-to-date comp[etitor]s are better. Worst features: With her shallow twin keels—of iron, which rusts—each weighing a mere 240 pounds, she is probably less weatherly, more tender, and slower in light air ..."

See also
List of sailing boat types

Related development
Vivacity 24

References

Keelboats
1960s sailboat type designs
Sailing yachts
Trailer sailers
Sailboat type designs by Peter Stevenson
Sailboat type designs by Des C. Pollard
Sailboat types built by Russell Marine